Nudol is a phenanthrenoid of the orchids Eulophia nuda, Eria carinata, Eria stricta and Maxillaria densa.

References 

Phenanthrenoids